The 2017–18 Omaha Mavericks men's basketball team represented the University of Nebraska Omaha during the 2017–18 NCAA Division I men's basketball season. The Mavericks, led by 13th-year head coach Derrin Hansen, played their home games at Baxter Arena as members of The Summit League. They finished the season 9–22, 4–10 in Summit League play to finish in seventh place. They lost in the quarterfinals of the Summit League tournament to South Dakota.

Previous season
The Mavericks finished the season 18–14, 9–7 in Summit League play to finish in third place. They beat Fort Wayne and IUPUI before losing to South Dakota State in the Summit League tournament championship.

Preseason 
In a poll of league coaches, media, and sports information directors, the Mavericks were picked to finish in sixth place.

Roster

Schedule and results

|-
!colspan=9 style=| Exhibition

|-
!colspan=9 style=|Regular season

|-
!colspan=9 style=| Summit League tournament

References

2017-18
2017–18 Summit League men's basketball season
2017 in sports in Nebraska
2018 in sports in Nebraska